Erdal Tosun (April 9, 1963 – November 30, 2016) was a Turkish actor.

Biography
Born in Istanbul to actor Necdet Tosun and the older brother of actor Gürdal Tosun, he graduated from Mimar Sinan Fine Arts University in 1982 and began his career mainly as a stage actor. During that time, Tosun worked alongside noted playwrights and directors such as Murathan Mungan, Yılmaz Erdoğan and he was even featured in adaptations of plays written by American actor Woody Allen. He also appeared in over 40 films and 13 television shows during his lifetime.

On screen, Tosun made his debut film appearance in the 1983 film Mine, directed by Atıf Yılmaz and among his most renowned appearances was the 2010 film Rina. As for television, Tosun appeared on the television series Kardeş Payı. This was one of his later performances before his death. As a voice artist, he provided a voice dubbing role for the video game League of Legends.

Personal life
In 1995, Tosun married İlknur Tosun but they divorced after 20 years of marriage. They had one daughter, Zeynep Kiraz Tosun, born in 1996.

Death
In the early hours of November 30, 2016, Tosun was killed in a traffic collision while driving past a junction in Istanbul. He was buried at Zincirlikuyu Cemetery alongside his father and brother.

Filmography

Cinema
Mine (1983)
Vizontele (2001)
Vizontele Tuuba (2004)
G.O.R.A. (2004)
Lovelorn (2005)
My Father and My Son (2005)
Magic Carpet Ride (2005)
Home Coming (2006)
The Masked Gang: Iraq (2007)
Kutsal Damacana (2007)
The Masked Gang: Cyprus (2008)
Jolly Life (2009)
Vay Arkadaş (2010)
Telling Tales (2015)
Trouble on Wheels (2015)
Düğün Dernek 2: Sünnet (2015)

Television
Bir Demet Tiyatro (1995-2007)
Kardeş Payı (2014-2015)

References

External links

1963 births
2016 deaths
Male actors from Istanbul
Mimar Sinan Fine Arts University alumni
Turkish male film actors
Turkish male television actors
Turkish male stage actors
20th-century Turkish male actors
21st-century Turkish male actors
Road incident deaths in Turkey
Burials at Zincirlikuyu Cemetery